Andrea Mandorlini (born 14 February 1991) is an Italian former professional footballer who played as a midfielder.

Career

Youth career
Mandorlini started his career at Ascoli Calcio 1898. He received his single national team call-up to 2005 Christmas Youth Tournament. Mandorlini joined Ascoli Allievi U17 team directly in 2006–07 season. Mandorlini spent 2008 to 2011 in the reserve league for Ascoli, which the last season was on loan from Vicenza.

Ascoli–Vicenza swap
On 29 June 2010, one day before the closure of 2009–10 financial year (on 30 June 2010), Ascoli and Vicenza made a swap deal, which saw Ivan Reali moved to Ascoli Piceno and Mandorlini moved to Vicenza. Both players were "valued" €800,000 and both clubs bought back 50% registration rights for half of the price (€400,000). Mandorlini signed a 4-year contract, costing Vicenza €200,000 a year as amortization (the way to book the transfer fee in capital accounts). The deal made both club had an immediately financial boost and speculative investment  Mandorlini was immediately returned to Ascoli reserve in temporary deal.

In June 2011 Mandorlini was sold to Vicenza outright, in exchange with Reali for the same price (€400,000).

Lega Pro loans
In mid-2011 Mandorlini left for Giacomense, rejoining former Ascoli "team-mate" Tanaglia. Mandorlini played most of the game as sub. On 1 July 2012 Vicenza terminated the contract of Mandorlini.

Footnotes

References

External links
 Football.it Profile 
 

Italian footballers
Ascoli Calcio 1898 F.C. players
L.R. Vicenza players
A.C. Giacomense players
Serie C players
Association football midfielders
1991 births
Living people